Ambrogio is a given name, and may refer to:

Saint Ambrogio (Ambrose), patron saint of Milan
Ambrogio Lorenzetti ( – 1348), painter
Ambrogio Damiano Achille Ratti, the birth name of Pope Pius XI
Ambrogio Bergognone, Renaissance painter
Ambrogio Spinola, 1st Marquis of the Balbases, general
Ambrogio Morelli, bicycle racer
Ambrogio Foppa, goldsmith
Ambrogio Calepino, lexicographer
Ambrogio Besozzi, Baroque painter
Ambrogio Casati, modern painter
Ambrogio Fogar, rally driver
Ambrogio Levati, gymnast
Ambrogio Minoja, classical composer
Ambrogio Frangiolli, architect

See also
 Ambrogio is also a British brand of robotic lawn mower
 Sant'Ambrogio (disambiguation)